Columbia County or County of Columbia or variant, may refer to:

Counties of Columbia
Columbia County is the name of eight counties in the United States:

 Columbia County, Arkansas
 Columbia County, Florida
 Columbia County, Georgia
 Columbia County, New York
 Columbia County, Oregon
 Columbia County, Pennsylvania
 Columbia County, Washington
 Columbia County, Wisconsin

Other uses
 Columbia County Airport (IATA airport code: HCC; FCC id: 1B1) Hudson, Columbia County, New York State, USA

See also 

 District of Columbia County, DC; Washington, DC, USA, treated as a county
 Columbiana County, Ohio, USA
 Columbus County, North Carolina, USA
 Counties of British Columbia, Canada
 Columbia Country, B.C., Canada
 
 
 County (disambiguation)
 Columbia (disambiguation)